Emmanuel Gonat (May 30, 1919 – November 21, 1979) was a French field hockey player who competed in the 1936 Summer Olympics.

He was a member of the French field hockey team, which finished  fourth in the 1936 Olympic tournament. He played two matches as a forward.

External links
 
Emmanuel Gonat's profile at Sports Reference.com

1919 births
1979 deaths
French male field hockey players
Olympic field hockey players of France
Field hockey players at the 1936 Summer Olympics